The Royal Rosarians are the "official greeters and ambassadors" of Portland, Oregon. The group was founded in 1912; members are most visible during the Portland Rose Festival.

See also
 Roses in Portland, Oregon
 Royal Rosarian (2011)

References

External links
 
 Royal Rosarian Foundation
 Royal Rosarians at the Oregon Encyclopedia

1912 establishments in Oregon
Civic organizations in Oregon
Culture of Portland, Oregon
Organizations based in Portland, Oregon